May McKisack (1900–1981) was a British medieval historian. She was professor of history at Westfield College in London and later professor of historiography at the University of Oxford and an honorary fellow of Somerville College Oxford. She is today chiefly remembered for writing The Fourteenth Century in George Clark's Oxford History of England.

References

People educated at Bedford High School, Bedfordshire
Alumni of Somerville College, Oxford
Fellows of Somerville College, Oxford
Academics of Westfield College
1900 births
1981 deaths
20th-century British historians